Smith Mills or Smiths Mills may refer to:

Smith Mills, Kentucky, an unincorporated community in Henderson County
Smith Mills, Massachusetts, a CDP in Dartmouth, Bristol County
Smiths Mill, Minnesota, an unincorporated community in Blue Earth and Waseca counties
Smith Mills, New York, a hamlet of Hanover